Podlesie  is a village in the administrative district of Gmina Lubaczów, within Lubaczów County, Subcarpathian Voivodeship, in south-eastern Poland, close to the border with Ukraine.

The village has a population of 75. It was established by German colonists in 1783 as Reichau, which was a part of a larger settlement campaign undertaken by the Austrian Empire in its then-young crownland Galicia.

References

Villages in Lubaczów County